Catullo Ciacci (4 May 1934 – 10 June 1996) was an Italian racing cyclist. He rode in the 1962 Tour de France.

References

External links
 

1934 births
1996 deaths
Italian male cyclists
Place of birth missing
Sportspeople from the Province of Pesaro and Urbino
Cyclists from Marche